Dolce far niente is a poem by Finnish poet Aaro Hellaakoski. First published in his 1928 collection Jääpeili ("The ice mirror") notable especially for its experimental typography, and was the subject of a study into the relationship between manuscript (or proof) and print version.

See also 

 Dolce far niente

Sources 

Finnish poems